Netherlands Marine Corps Museum (Dutch - Mariniersmuseum) is a museum on the history of the Netherlands Marine Corps. Since December 1995 it has been housed in a building on the Wijnhaven in Rotterdam. Since 2014 it has been one of the four museums managed by the Koninklijke Stichting Defensiemusea (KSD).

References

Museums in Rotterdam
Military and war museums in the Netherlands
Netherlands Marine Corps
Maritime museums in the Netherlands